Sergio Domínguez Muñoz (born 12 April 1986) is a Spanish former cyclist. He rode in the 2009 Vuelta a España, but failed to finish.

References

1986 births
Living people
Spanish male cyclists
People from Yecla
Cyclists from the Region of Murcia